Xerez Club was a Spanish football team from Jerez de la Frontera, Andalusia, Spain. Founded in 1907 by Sir Thomas Spencer Reiman, a worker from William's & Humbert.

History

Founded in 1907, in 1933 it was refounded as Xerez Foot-ball Club after the war it was renamed Xerez Club. In 1947 Xerez Club and CD Jerez merged in Xerez CD.

Background
Xerez Club - (1932–1946) → ↓
Xerez Club Deportivo - (1947–present)
Club Deportivo Jerez - (1942–1946) → ↑

Seasons

Xerez FC:

Xerez Club:

8 seasons in Segunda División
1 season in Tercera División

External links
Official website of Xerez CD 
La futbolteca team profile 

 
Association football clubs established in 1907
Association football clubs disestablished in 1946
Defunct football clubs in Andalusia
1907 establishments in Spain
1946 disestablishments in Spain
Segunda División clubs